Edema Godmin Fuludu (born 8 May 1970) is a Nigerian former footballer who played as a midfielder. He played club football for New Nigerian Bank, BCC Lions and Julius Berger in Nigeria and Altay in Turkey, and played internationally for the Nigeria national team. He was part of Nigeria's squad for the 1994 African Cup of Nations. Fuludu has served as head coach of Warri Wolves.

References

1970 births
Living people
Nigerian footballers
Nigeria international footballers
People from Delta State
Association football midfielders
New Nigerian Bank F.C. players
BCC Lions F.C. players
Bridge F.C. players
Altay S.K. footballers
Nigeria Professional Football League players
Süper Lig players
1994 African Cup of Nations players
Warri Wolves F.C. managers
Nigerian expatriate footballers
Expatriate footballers in Turkey
Nigerian expatriate sportspeople in Turkey